The 2012 UMass Minutemen football team represented the University of Massachusetts Amherst in the 2012 NCAA Division I FBS football season as a member of the Mid-American Conference. The team was coached by Charley Molnar and played its home games at Gillette Stadium in Foxborough, Massachusetts.

The 2012 season was the team's first as a member of the MAC, as they continued their transition to NCAA Division I FBS play.  Because of this, they were ineligible to participate in the conference championship.

However, according to an August 2, 2012 ruling by the NCAA UMass would have been eligible to participate in a bowl game if they achieved at least 6 wins, and there were not enough spots to fill all bowl games.

The 2012 season was Charley Molnar's first as head coach of the Minutemen, previously serving as Offensive coordinator of the Notre Dame Fighting Irish.

The team would finish the season with a record of 1–11 overall with a Conference record of 1–7 which placed them in 6th place in the MAC East Division.  At the end of the season three players were selected to All-MAC teams. Senior linebacker Perry McIntyre was named to the All-MAC First Team Defense, while senior safety Darren Thellen earned Second Team accolades. Punter Colter Johnson, a junior, was also honored as a Third Team selection.

Schedule

Game summaries

@ UConn

Indiana

@ Michigan

@ Miami (Ohio)

Ohio

Western Michigan

Bowling Green

@ Vanderbilt

@ Northern Illinois

@ Akron

Buffalo

Central Michigan

Team players selected in the 2013 NFL Draft

References

External links

UMass
UMass Minutemen football seasons
UMass Minutemen football